Submarine Bells is an album by New Zealand group the Chills, released in 1990. This was the band's first album on a major label, as Martin Phillipps signed to Warner Bros. Records subsidiary Slash Records, to release the album in the U.S. The album reached #1 on the New Zealand album charts and had significant support from American college radio. The album was awarded gold status in New Zealand and represents the peak of the Chills' popularity at home. It is considered to be one of the defining albums of the Dunedin sound. The supporting tour for Submarine Bells culminated in a triumphant home-coming concert in Dunedin Town Hall.

Critical reception 

Trouser Press singled out the "splendorous title track", the "should-have-been-a-smash 'Heavenly Pop Hit'", and many other individual tracks, but chiefly praised the album for its overall cohesion and consistency – signs of the Chills' evolution from "a first-rate singles band" to a fully formed artistic venture with a "mature, restrained and affectingly personal approach". In his book Music: What Happened?, musician and critic Scott Miller calls it "a dynamite whole album", and "the international star and culmination of" the Dunedin sound. He also ranks "Heavenly Pop Hit" among the year's best songs.

Awards 
The album won Best Album at the 1990 New Zealand Music Awards, and "Heavenly Pop Hit" won Single of the Year.

Track listing 
All songs written by Martin Phillipps.
"Heavenly Pop Hit"
"Tied Up in Chain"
"The Oncoming Day"
"Part Past Part Fiction"
"Singing in My Sleep"
"I Soar"
"Dead Web"
"Familiarity Breeds Contempt"
"Don't Be – Memory"
"Effloresce and Deliquesce"
"Sweet Times"
"Submarine Bells"

Chart performance 
Submarine Bells was a huge success in the Chills' home country. It entered the New Zealand album chart at No. 7 in June 1990 and reached No. 1 the following week, ultimately spending 14 weeks on the chart in total. The single "Heavenly Pop Hit" was released in July and peaked at No. 2. Elsewhere, however, it made minimal commercial impact. The album did not chart in Australia, the UK, or the U.S., although "Heavenly Pop Hit" achieved some success on the U.S. Alternative Songs chart. "Part Past Part Fiction" was released by Slash as a single in Australia, but did not enter the chart.

Charts

Weekly charts

Year-end charts

Single

References

External links
 

1990 albums
Flying Nun Records albums
Slash Records albums
The Chills albums
Dunedin Sound albums